Undertown may refer to:

Undertown (comics)
Undertown (album), by Calm Down Juanita 2002
Under Town, 2004 book in Edgar & Ellen series